In late August 1967, the English rock band the Beatles attended a seminar on Transcendental Meditation (TM) held by Indian teacher Maharishi Mahesh Yogi at a training college in Bangor in north-west Wales. The visit attracted international publicity for Transcendental Meditation and presented the 1960s youth movement with an alternative to psychedelic drugs as a means to attaining higher consciousness. The Beatles' endorsement of the technique followed the band's incorporation of Indian musical and philosophical influences in their work, and was initiated by George Harrison's disillusionment with Haight-Ashbury in San Francisco, which he visited in early August.

The British press gave the nickname "the Mystical Special" to the train that transported the Beatles from London to Bangor, and some reacted with suspicion to the band's sudden devotion to the Maharishi. The four band members were accompanied by their partners and by fellow artists such as Mick Jagger, Marianne Faithfull and Cilla Black. On 27 August, the Beatles learned of the death of their manager, Brian Epstein, and cut their visit short. The four were impressed by the Maharishi's teachings and agreed to join him at his ashram in Rishikesh, India to further their studies in meditation.

Background and introduction to the Maharishi

In the mid-1960s, the Beatles became interested in Indian culture, after the band members, particularly John Lennon and George Harrison, began using the psychedelic drug lysergic acid diethylamide (LSD) in an effort to expand their consciousness. In September and October 1966, Harrison visited India, where, in addition to furthering his sitar studies under Indian classical musician Ravi Shankar, he developed a fascination for Vedic philosophy. Eager to find meaning in the Beatles' worldwide popularity, Harrison and his wife, Pattie Boyd, investigated several options in their search for a guru, or spiritual teacher. According to Boyd, in February 1967, she began attending meetings in London held by the Spiritual Regeneration Movement, an organisation that espoused the Transcendental Meditation technique devised by Maharishi Mahesh Yogi, and she soon shared her discoveries with Harrison. In early August, the couple visited the Haight-Ashbury district of San Francisco, an area that represented the international centre of the hippie movement during the Summer of Love. Harrison was dismayed that Haight-Ashbury appeared to be populated by drug addicts and dropouts, rather than enlightened members of the counterculture. Mindful of the Beatles' considerable influence on Western youth, particularly after the release of their 1967 album Sgt. Pepper's Lonely Hearts Club Band, Harrison decided to quit taking LSD. On his return to London, he shared his disappointment with Lennon, who had similarly begun to question the benefits of LSD.

The Maharishi was familiar to the Beatles through his appearances on the Granada Television programme People and Places years earlier. Alexis "Magic Alex" Mardas, a Greek friend of the Beatles, had heard a lecture by the Maharishi in Athens; when it was announced that he was to make a public appearance in London in late August that year, Boyd and Mardas encouraged the Beatles to attend. The London-based sculptor David Wynne has also been credited with the introduction. In Harrison's recollection, it was Wynne who told him about the Maharishi's upcoming visit and recommended that Harrison attend.

On 24 August, Lennon, Harrison and Paul McCartney, together with their respective partners, attended the Maharishi's lecture in the ballroom at the London Hilton, on Park Lane. Ringo Starr was not present, due to the recent birth of his and Maureen Starkey's second child, Jason. The Maharishi had announced his intention to retire, so this engagement was expected to be his last in the West. The Beatles were given front row seats and then met the Maharishi in his hotel suite after the lecture. During the meeting, he invited them to be his guests at a ten-day training retreat that was to begin the following day, in Bangor in north-west Wales. Impressed by the lecture and meeting the Maharishi, the band cancelled a recording session in order to accompany him to Bangor.

Departure and experience
On 25 August, the Beatles travelled by train to Bangor. In their enthusiasm for the Maharishi, the group had invited friends such as Mick Jagger, Marianne Faithfull, Cilla Black, and Harrison's sister-in-law Jenny Boyd. It was the first time for several years that the band had travelled without their manager, Brian Epstein, and their tour managers, and they had not even thought to bring money. Lennon remarked that it was "like going somewhere without your trousers on". The Beatles arrived at London's Euston Station late in the afternoon and were caught up in a large crowd, made worse by the fact that it was the Friday before the UK's late-summer Bank holiday weekend. They were left to carry their own luggage due to the absence of their assistants and were mobbed on their way to the station platform. Lennon's wife Cynthia became separated from the group and, mistaken for a fan, was then held back by police officers. Peter Brown, an executive at Epstein's company NEMS, arranged for Neil Aspinall to drive her to Bangor by car.

The band and their entourage were under constant scrutiny by reporters, photographers and television film crews who dubbed the train "the Mystical Special". During the journey, the Beatles joined the Maharishi in his first class compartment, partly to escape the attention of the press. In Faithfull's recollection, Harrison and Boyd were the "real spiritual seekers" and Lennon also, "in his own way", but McCartney was "very cynical" about the venture. All of the Beatles were drawn to the Maharishi's contention that bliss was attainable through short sessions of meditation, with minimal change to their working day and regular lifestyle. Starr later said of his first meeting with the Maharishi: "The man was so full of joy and happiness and it just blew my mind ... I thought 'I want some of that'."

A large crowd of fans was gathered at Bangor railway station awaiting the Beatles' arrival. The retreat was held at Bangor Normal College and served as an initiation course in Transcendental Meditation. The Beatles and around 300 others learned the basics of TM, and each initiate was given a personal mantra. In a 1967 interview, Harrison explained the process:
Each person's life pulsates in a certain rhythm, so they give you a word or sound, known as a mantra, which pulsates with that rhythm. By using the mantra … to transcend to the subtlest level of thought … the mantra becomes more subtle and more subtle, until finally you've lost even the mantra, and then you find yourself at that level of pure consciousness.

All initiates were asked to donate a week's wages. Lennon described the financial arrangement as "the fairest thing I've heard of", adding: "We'll make a donation and we'll ask for money from anyone we know with money … anyone in the so-called establishment who's worried about kids going wild and drugs and all that. Another groovy thing: everybody gives one week's wages when they join … And that's all you ever pay, just the once."

On 26 August, the Beatles announced at a press conference that they were giving up hallucinogenic drugs. The announcement came as an about-turn after McCartney had publicly admitted in June 1967 to taking LSD, to the dismay of his bandmates. Their renouncing was in keeping with the Maharishi's teachings, yet it was a group decision made before meeting the Maharishi. The Maharishi did advise them privately to avoid involvement with the "Ban the Bomb" movement and to support the elected government of the day. Lennon later described the retreat as "incredible" and recalled that Jagger immediately telephoned his Rolling Stones bandmate Keith Richards, telling him to come down with Brian Jones and the other members of their band.

Epstein's death
The Beatles' intention was to attend the entire ten-day seminar, but their stay was cut short by the death of their manager in London on 27 August. Epstein had arranged to entertain friends at his property in Sussex over the bank holiday weekend, but had said that he might join the band towards the end of the seminar. The Maharishi consoled them by saying that Epstein's spirit was still with them, and their good thoughts would help him "to have an easy passage" and journey to his "next evolution". The Beatles held a press conference, during which Lennon and Harrison explained the Maharishi's views on death. According to McCartney, the Maharishi "was great to us when Brian died". Cynthia Lennon later wrote: "it was as though, with Brian gone, the four needed someone new to give them direction and the Maharishi was in the right place at the right time."

Aftermath and cultural influence

The Beatles made plans to spend time at the Maharishi's training centre in India in late October. However, at McCartney's urging, they postponed the trip until the new year to work on their Magical Mystery Tour film project, since he was concerned that they should first focus on their career, with the loss of Epstein. Harrison and Lennon appeared on David Frost's television programme in autumn 1967 espousing the benefits of Transcendental Meditation, at which point, according to his wife, Lennon was "evangelical in his enthusiasm for Maharishi". Due to the interest generated by their first appearance on the show, on 29 September, Frost invited the pair back a week later, when they discussed TM with a studio audience comprising clergymen, academics and journalists.

The Beatles' allegiance to the Maharishi and his teachings marked the first time that the band had committed to employing their influence to popularising a cause. Their attendance at the Bangor seminar, together with Harrison and Lennon's promotional activities, resulted in Transcendental Meditation becoming a worldwide phenomenon. In his book American Veda, author Philip Goldberg likens the Maharishi's Hilton lecture to Swami Vivekananda's visit to the West in 1893, in terms of its importance for Indian religion. As a result of the coverage given to the Beatles' interest, words such as "mantra" and "guru" became commonly used in the West for the first time. While the band's new, anti-LSD message was met with approval, their championing of the Maharishi and his TM technique was often the subject of confusion and ridicule in the mainstream press, particularly in Britain. At a court event in October, Queen Elizabeth II remarked to Sir Joseph Lockwood, the chairman of EMI: "The Beatles are turning awfully funny, aren't they?" Now publicised as "The Beatles' Guru", the Maharishi went on his eighth world tour, giving lectures in Britain, Scandinavia, West Germany, Italy, Canada and California.

Among the counterculture and the underground press, the Maharishi's ascendancy was viewed as a significant development in the youth movement's search for universal spiritual awareness.
To some members of the US counterculture, the Beatles had found the "answer"; their endorsement of meditation was especially welcome in Haight-Ashbury, where summer's end was marked by an increase in drug casualties. The Beatles' more spiritually aware peers were also inspired by their example. Scottish singer Donovan sought out the Maharishi in California, having bonded with Harrison following the latter's return from India in late 1966. Donovan later said that he and Harrison had avidly read Hindu spiritual texts and discussed meditation as a way to achieve genuine higher consciousness, but they had lacked the method and a "guide" until meeting the Maharishi. Harrison also introduced Dennis Wilson of the Beach Boys to the Maharishi when he and Lennon joined their teacher at a UNICEF benefit in Paris in December. Other artists who followed the Beatles' lead into TM included members of the bands the Grateful Dead and Jefferson Airplane, all of whom met the Maharishi with Jagger and Donovan in Los Angeles that autumn.

Due to the Beatles' attendance at Bangor and their commitment to study in India, the Maharishi's following increased tenfold to 150,000 students. In November 1967, The Village Voice said that, given how many rock musicians had embraced meditation, and the popularity of TM initiation courses on university campuses, "it looks now that Maharishi may become more popular than the Beatles." In February 1968, having twice delayed their departure for India, the Beatles and their wives or girlfriends joined the Maharishi at his ashram in Rishikesh. Their fellow students included Donovan, Mike Love of the Beach Boys, and American actress Mia Farrow.

Notes

References

Sources

External links
"Bangor pays homage to the Beatles", The Guardian, 23 August 2002
"Remembering the time the Beatles came to Bangor …", itv.com, 11 November 2015

1967 in the United Kingdom
History of the Beatles
The Beatles and India
Transcendental Meditation
Bangor, Gwynedd